Patriarch Germogen may refer to:

Patriarch Hermogenes (1530–1612), Patriarch of all Russia
Patriarch Germogen of Croatia (1861–1945), Patriarch of Croatian Orthodox Church